EVGA Corporation is an American computer hardware company that produces motherboards, gaming laptops, power supplies, All-In-One Liquid Coolers, computer cases, and gaming mice. Founded on April 13, 1999, its headquarters are in Brea, California. EVGA also produced Nvidia-GPU-based video cards until 2022.

Products 
EVGA products include motherboards, power supply units, and related accessories. EVGA initially made graphics cards, dating back to the RIVA TNT2 in 1999. Some of their graphics card models included the SC, SSC, Classified, Kingpin (Stylized K|NGP|N), and FTW editions (as well as special KO editions in the past). In September 2022, the company ended its relationship with NVIDIA and also stopped manufacturing graphics cards.

Initially, its motherboards were limited to NVIDIA reference designs and expanded to non-reference designs based on NVIDIA chipsets until NVIDIA exited the motherboard market around 2009. EVGA motherboards began using Intel chipsets starting with the announcement of the "X58 SLI" in November 2008, which was a motherboard supporting 3-way SLI. In March 2009 EVGA released the "X58 Classified" (E759) that increased the PCI Express (PCIe) capabilities by adding more physical slots and added an NVIDIA NF200 bridging chip that increased the electronic PCIe lanes available, as well as other overclocking features.

Exit from GPU Partnerships and Manufacturing 

On September 16, 2022, EVGA announced that it would be exiting the GPU business and terminating its partnership with Nvidia. At the time of the announcement, GPU sales accounted for close to 80% of EVGA's gross revenue. EVGA's CEO, Andrew Han, explained that the company did not have an interest in becoming an add-in board partner for other GPU vendors, such as AMD or Intel, nor did EVGA plan to sell to another company. EVGA planned to continue to sell remaining RTX 30-series stock through the end of 2022 to complete the exit from the NVIDIA partnership. Han further explained that NVIDIA's conduct with its business partners was causing it to be difficult to maintain a consistent profit margin and thus the company would instead focus on other products with higher margins such as power supply units.

Significant Product Launches

In September 2009, EVGA released a motherboard (XL-ATX form factor) that allows up to four GPUs to run in a 4-way SLI configuration. The first graphics processing unit to support 4-way SLI was the EVGA GTX 285 Classified; more recent GPUs like the GTX 980 also support 4-way SLI. The company released a dual-socket motherboard based on the Intel 5520 chip set with overclocking features. Named Classified SR-2, this motherboard supports dual Socket LGA 1366 Xeon-based Intel CPUs and 4-way SLI. It was the first HPTX form factor motherboard.

In August 2010, EVGA released the Classified SR-2 power supply with 1200 watts of power at 6 +12 volts.

In May 2011, EVGA entered the CPU air cooler market with the introduction of the Super clock CPU cooler.

In November 2013, EVGA released its first tablet computer, the EVGA Tegra Note 7, in the United States. It is a 7-inch Android tablet powered by a Tegra 4 processor.

In May 2016, EVGA released its first gaming laptop called the EVGA SC17.

In June 2021, EVGA announced its first AMD-based motherboards starting with the X570 Dark (A579), which was released in September. Later that year, EVGA also released the X570 FTW (A577).

See also 
 ASRock
 Asus
 BFG Technologies
 Club 3D
 Elitegroup Computer Systems (ECS)
 Gigabyte Technology
 MSI
 NVIDIA
 PowerColor
 Sapphire Technology

References

External links
 

Electronics companies established in 1999
Graphics hardware companies
Motherboard companies
Privately held companies based in California
1999 establishments in California
Computer power supply unit manufacturers
Computer enclosure companies
Computer hardware cooling